Jim Crowley (born October 4, 1970) is an American basketball coach who is currently the head women's basketball coach at St. Bonaventure University. He was previously the head coach at Providence College, and before that, he was the head coach at St. Bonaventure University.

Head coaching record

References

External links 
 
 Providence profile

1970 births
Living people
People from Windsor, New York
Basketball players from New York (state)
Basketball coaches from New York (state)
Keuka College alumni
St. Bonaventure Bonnies women's basketball coaches
Providence Friars women's basketball coaches